The Mothership Returns is a live two CD set and one DVD by the fusion band Return to Forever. Released 18 June 2012 by Eagle Rock Entertainment, the double CD set documents the music performed during the 2011 tour. Return to Forever was expanded for this tour to quintet and featured keyboardist Chick Corea, bassist Stanley Clarke, drummer Lenny White, guitarist Frank Gambale and violinist Jean-Luc Ponty. The album peaked #6 in the 2012 and 2013 Jazz Album charts.

Track listing

Disc one
"Medieval Overture" (Chick Corea) – 6:03
"Senor Mouse" (Corea) – 12:10
"Shadow of Love/Sorceress" (Lenny White) – 16:05
"Renaissance" (Jean-Luc Ponty) – 19:40

Disc two
"After the Cosmic Rain" (Stanley Clarke) – 16:52
"The Romantic Warrior / Señor Blues" (Corea, Horace Silver) – 18:20
"Concierto de Aranjuez / Spain" (Corea, Joaquín Rodrigo) – 8:12
"School Days" (Clarke) – 11:24
"Beyond the Seventh Galaxy" (Corea) – 3:44

DVD-Video 
 Inside the Music (film, documentary)
 "After the Cosmic Rain" (Live, Austin, Texas)
 "The Romantic Warrior" (Live, Montreux, Switzerland)
 The Story of Return to Forever (sneak peek movie trailer)

Personnel 
Musicians
 Chick Corea – acoustic piano, keyboards
 Stanley Clarke – double bass, electric bass
 Lenny White – drums
 Jean-Luc Ponty – violin
 Frank Gambale – acoustic guitar, electric guitar

Production
 Devin Villery – audio systems technician
 Bernie Kirsch – monitor engineer
 Travis Rogers – sound engineer
 Tim Cavanaugh – producer
 Stanley Clarke – co- & executive producer
 Chick Corea – co- & executive producer
 Geoff Kempin – executive producer
 Terry Shand – executive producer
 Lenny White – producer, executive producer
 Terry Cooley – production manager
 Rob Griffin – tour manager
 Mick Guzauski – mixing
 Buck Snow – mixing
 Greg Calbi – mastering
 Adam Mason – editing, producer
 Kris Campbell – tour manager
 Paul May – tour manager
 James "McGoo" McGregor – stage technician
 Brian Alexander – keyboard technician
 Eric "Stretch" Hanson – bass technician
 Jim Moran – drum technician
 Matt Druzbik – lighting director
 Evelyn Brechtlein – production coordination
 Anna Robertson – production assistant
 Librado Barocio – director
 Dan Muse – liner note coordination
 Liner notes by Chick Corea, Jean-Luc Ponty, Frank Gambale, Stanley Clarke, Lenny White, Robert Trujillo
 Graphic design by Marc Bessant, Julie Rooney
 Photography by Matt Bizer, Andrew Elliott, Martin Philby, Arne B. Rostad

Chart performance

References

External links 
 Return to Forever - The Mothership Returns (2012) album review by Thom Jurek, credits & releases at AllMusic
 Return to Forever - The Mothership Returns (2012) album releases & credits at Discogs
 Return to Forever - The Mothership Returns (2012) album credits & user reviews at ProgArchives.com
 Return to Forever - The Mothership Returns (2012) album to be listened as stream on Spotify

Return to Forever albums
2012 live albums
Live jazz fusion albums
Eagle Records live albums